The 2017–18 Kentucky Wildcats men's basketball team represented the University of Kentucky in the 2017–18 NCAA Division I men's basketball season. The team played its home games in Lexington, Kentucky for the 42nd consecutive season at Rupp Arena, with a capacity of 23,500. The team, led by John Calipari in his ninth season as head coach, was a member of the Southeastern Conference.

On January 22, 2018, following losses to South Carolina on the road, and to Florida at home, the Wildcats fell out of the AP rankings for the first time since March 2014.

They finished the season 26–11, 10–8 in SEC play to finish in three-way tie for fourth place. They defeated Georgia, Alabama, and Tennessee to become champions of the SEC tournament. They earned the SEC's automatic bid to the NCAA tournament where they defeated Davidson and Buffalo to advance to the Sweet Sixteen where they lost to Kansas State.

Previous season 
The Wildcats finished the 2016–17 season 32–6, 16–2 in SEC play to win the regular season SEC championship. In the SEC tournament the Wildcats beat Georgia, Alabama, and Arkansas to win the tournament championship. As a result, the Wildcats received the conference's automatic bid to the NCAA tournament. As a No. 2 seed in the South region, they defeated No. 15 Northern Kentucky and No. 10 Wichita State to advance to the Sweet 16. There, they defeated No. 3 UCLA to advance to the Elite Eight where they lost to eventual National Champion, No. 1 North Carolina.

Offseason

Summary
On April 3, 2017, De'Aaron Fox announced that he was leaving the program to enter the 2017 NBA draft, and would forgo his remaining eligibility. On April 4, 2017, Malik Monk, in a release to the fanbase, stated that he intended to enter the NBA draft and sign with an agent, thus ending his remaining eligibility with the program. On April 6, 2017, Isaiah Briscoe announced that he was leaving Kentucky to enter the 2017 NBA Draft, and would sign with an agent, forgoing his remaining eligibility. On April 12, 2017, Isaac Humphries announced that he was leaving Kentucky to pursue a professional career in basketball and will sign with an agent, and would forgo remaining eligibility. On April 24, 2017, Bam Adebayo stated that he intended to sign with an agent, thus ending his remaining eligibility with the program. On May 24, 2017, the final day on which players who wished to return to college basketball could withdraw from the NBA draft, Hamidou Diallo, who entered the draft without hiring an agent, announced that he would return to Kentucky to play in 2017–18.

Departures

2017–18 newcomers
Nick Richards, a native of Kingston, Jamaica who moved to Queens, New York in 2013, was the first commitment in the Kentucky class. He committed to Kentucky on November 10 at a press conference at his high school. He chose Kentucky over Arizona and Syracuse. He was a consensus five star prospect, and was ranked the consensus No. 14 overall player by the four main recruiting services.

P. J. Washington, a Dallas native attending school in Las Vegas, Nevada, was the second commitment in the Kentucky class. He committed to Kentucky on November 10 live on ESPNU. He chose Kentucky over North Carolina and UNLV. He was a consensus five star prospect, and was ranked the consensus No. 15 overall player by the four main recruiting services.

Shai Gilgeous-Alexander, originally from Hamilton, Ontario and attending school in Chattanooga, Tennessee, was the third commitment in the Kentucky class.  He committed to Kentucky on November 14 through a message on Twitter.  He was a consensus top fifty player, ranked No. 42 by the four main recruiting services Rivals, ESPN, Scout, and 24/7 Sports.

Quade Green, from Philadelphia, Pennsylvania, was the fourth commitment in the Kentucky class. He signed his National Letter of Intent on November 16, the last day of the early signing period, but did not reveal his choice between Kentucky and Syracuse until an event at his high school on November 19 - with his mother Tamika Johnson by his side. He was a consensus top-25 player and ranked as a five-star player by the four main recruiting services Rivals, ESPN, Scout, and 24/7 Sports.

Hamidou Diallo, a Queens native who graduated from a Connecticut school in spring 2016, announced on January 7, 2017 that he would enroll at UK for the start of the school's spring semester the following week. While he was eligible to play immediately, he redshirted the spring semester and began play as a freshman in 2017–18.

Jemarl Baker, a native of Eastvale, California, was the seventh commitment in the Kentucky recruiting class. He announced his decision on April 11 via a story posted on Scout.com by Evan Daniels. Baker originally committed to Cuonzo Martin at California, before Martin left the school to coach Missouri. He averaged 17.1 points, 4.1 assists, 3.5 rebounds and 1.8 steals for Roosevelt High School in Corona, Calif., and he quickly emerged as one of the Wildcats' top backcourt targets after their season ended last month. Scout.com ranks Baker as the No. 86 overall prospect in the 2017 class.

UK's final commitment came on May 6, when Tampa product Kevin Knox announced he would come to the school. Kentucky beat out Duke, Florida State, North Carolina, and Missouri for Knox's signature.

2018–19 newcomers
Immanuel Quickley, from Havre de Grace, Maryland, was the first commitment in the Kentucky's 2018 class. He committed to Kentucky on September 22, over offers from Kansas and Miami. He was a consensus five-star prospect, and was ranked the consensus No. 12 overall player by the four main recruiting services.

The Wildcats' second 2018 commitment was Keldon Johnson, a small forward from South Hill, Virginia, who committed on November 11. Kentucky beat out Maryland, NC State, and Texas for Johnson's signature. He was also a consensus five-star prospect, and ranked by ESPN as its No. 7 overall prospect.

Tyler Herro was the third commitment for Kentucky's 2018 class. Formerly committed to Wisconsin, Herro committed to Kentucky the week after his official visit. Herro was a consensus four-star prospect and was ranked the No. 4 shooting guard in the 2018 class by ESPN.

E.J. Montgomery was the fourth commitment for Kentucky's 2018 class. Former committed to Auburn, he re-opened his recruitment after the Auburn staff was implicated in the 2017–18 NCAA Division I men's basketball corruption scandal. Montgomery committed to Kentucky on April 9, 2018. Montgomery was a five-star prospect and was ranked No. 12 in the 2018 class.

Roster

Roster is subject to change as/if players transfer or leave the program for other reasons.

Depth chart

Schedule and results
On June 6, 2017 Kentucky released the non-conference portion of its schedule. The schedule is highlighted by marquee match-ups at Rupp Arena and across the country. Kentucky traveled to Chicago to play Kansas in the annual Champions Classic, to New York to play Monmouth, to New Orleans to play against UCLA in the annual CBS Sports Classic, and finally to face in-state rival Louisville in Lexington. Kentucky also hosted Virginia Tech and traveled to play West Virginia in the Big 12/SEC Challenge.

Big Blue Madness took place on October 13. The event was the debut of the team for the 2017–18 season. The annual Blue-White game took place on October 20, 2017.

|-
!colspan=12 style=| Exhibition

|-
!colspan=12 style=| Regular Season

|-
!colspan=12 style=|SEC Tournament

|-
!colspan=12 style=| NCAA tournament

Rankings

*AP does not release post-NCAA Tournament rankings

References

Kentucky
Kentucky Wildcats men's basketball seasons
Kentucky basketball, men
Kentucky basketball, men, 2017-18
Kentucky